The 1998 Caribbean Football Union Club Championship was an international club football competition held in the Caribbean to determine the region's qualifiers to the CONCACAF Champions' Cup.
The winners Joe Public F.C. advanced to CONCACAF Champions' Cup 1999.

presided by Jack Warner of Trinidad and Tobago, decided to invite two additional teams from Trinidad and Tobago.

Quarter finals

Semi-finals

Final

Joe Public F.C. advance to CONCACAF Champions' Cup 1999

1998
1